The Athens Messenger is a daily newspaper published in Athens, Ohio, United States, serving Athens and the surrounding communities of Athens County.

The Athens Messenger was established in 1848, and became a daily publication in 1904. It has a daily circulation of about 10,000 and a weekly circulation of about 12,000 Sunday.  

The newspaper was owned and published by Brown Publishing Company, which publishes more than fifteen daily newspapers and over sixty weekly newspapers.  In 2007, it was sold to American Consolidated Media. American Consolidated Media owned more than 100 newspapers in 18 distinct regions of the United States. In 2014, Adams Publishing group acquired 34 papers, including the Messenger, from ACM.

References

Further reading
 
 The Writings of Andrew Stritmatter (1847-1880): Missionary in China in the 1870s Letter From China (AM) - Chinese Language

External links
 The Athens Messenger

Publications established in 1848
Newspapers published in Ohio
1848 establishments in Ohio
Mass media in Athens, Ohio